Chief Albert Luthuli Regiment (formerly Regiment De Wet) is a reserve infantry battalion of the South African Army.

History

Origins
Regiment de Wet was one of six Afrikaans-speaking Citizen Force regiments established as part of the expansion of the then Union Defence Force of South Africa.

The regiment was named after the Orange Free State Boer War commandant, Christiaan de Wet.

The regiment's headquarters was located in Kroonstad, a large town in the Orange Free State and a vital railway junction that gave some strategic importance, and recruits were enlisted from the entire Orange Free State province.

World War 2
The Regiment was used to reinforce the ranks of Regiment President Steyn during World War two, both of which were infantry units at the time.

Reorganisation
Regiment President Steyn was converted to an armored car regiment and in 1975 to a tank regiment but Regiment de Wet remained infantry.

Incorporation
Regiment de Wet was absorbed into Regiment Bloemspruit around April 1997.

Name change
After having been raised again; in August 2019, 52 Reserve Force units had their names changed to reflect the diverse military history of South Africa. Regiment De Wet became the Chief Albert Luthuli Regiment, and have 3 years to design and implement new regimental insignia.

Battle honours

The unit also served in numerous deployments in the Border War in SWA/Namibia

Freedom of the City
Freedom of Kroonstad

Leadership

Regimental emblems

Dress Insignia

Roll of Honour

References

Infantry regiments of South Africa
Military units and formations of South Africa in the Border War
South African Army